Tjersland is a Norwegian surname. Notable people with the surname include:

Alf Tjersland (1881–1955), Norwegian engineer and businessman
Arne Tjersland (1924–2015), Norwegian politician
Odd Arne Tjersland (born 1947), Norwegian psychologist

Norwegian-language surnames